Robert Newbegin II (February 5, 1905 – November 15, 1991) was an American diplomat.  Born in Bangor, Maine, he was raised in Cambridge, Massachusetts and graduated from Yale University. He entered the Foreign Service in 1929 and served in Berlin, Montevideo, Mexico City, Istanbul, Ankara, Santo Domingo, Bogota and Paris, as well as Washington.
He was appointed a Foreign Service inspector in 1952, director of the Office of Middle American Affairs in the State Department in 1954 and Deputy Assistant Secretary of State for personnel in 1956.

Newbegin served as U.S. Ambassador to Honduras from 1958 to 1960, when he became Ambassador to Haiti. He retired from the Foreign Service in 1962, but was a State Department negotiator on the Panama Canal treaty the next year.

While Ambassador to Haiti in 1961, Newbegin was recalled to Washington prior to the inauguration of dictator François Duvalier, in protest of his fraudulent election.  A Marine colonel stationed in Haiti once referred to Newbegin as an "extremely decisive and strong-willed Ambassador", a judgement echoed in other sources. In a state department briefing during the recall, however, Newbegin expressed the opinion that there was no credible opposition in Haiti to Duvalier, and thus that the recall would have little positive effect. Newbegin was right, in that the US cut off economic assistance in 1962 and Duvalier appointed himself President for Life in 1964. While ambassador, Newbegin instituted a French-language training programme among US government personnel there, and urged Americans to step up their contributions to Haitian charities.

References

United States Department of State officials
Ambassadors of the United States to Honduras
Ambassadors of the United States to Haiti
Yale University alumni
1905 births
1991 deaths
People from Bangor, Maine
United States Foreign Service personnel
20th-century American diplomats
American expatriates in Germany
American expatriates in Uruguay
American expatriates in Mexico
American expatriates in Turkey
American expatriates in the Dominican Republic
American expatriates in Colombia
American expatriates in France